The Cimarron Solar Facility is a 30 megawatt (MWAC) photovoltaic power station in Colfax County, New Mexico.  It was the largest solar facility in the state when completed in December 2010, and uses thin film solar panels manufactured by the U.S. firm First Solar. The electricity is being sold to Tri-State Generation and Transmission under a 25-year power purchase agreement.

Electricity production

See also

Solar power in New Mexico

References

External links
 Cimarron Solar Facility - Fact Sheet
 Tri-State Generation and Transmission, the G&T coop under contract to purchase the Cimarron energy production

Energy infrastructure completed in 2010
Buildings and structures in Colfax County, New Mexico
Power stations in New Mexico
Solar power stations in New Mexico